Lorenzo Ndele Simonelli (born 1 June 2002) is a Tanzanian-born Italian hurdler who was 4th at the 2023 European indoor Championships.

Biography
Born in Dodoma, Tanzania to an Italian father (anthropologist and researcher) and a Tanzanian mother, he moved with his family to Rome at the age of 5.

Career
At the indoor Europeans in Istanbul 2023, credited at the same time as the hundredth of the third place, after the photo-finish check he missed the bronze medal by 5 thousandths of a second.

Achievements
Senior

National titles
Simonelli has won a national championship at individual senior level

Italian Athletics Indoor Championships
60 m hs: 2023.

See also
 Italian all-time lists - 110 metres hurdles

References

External links
 

2002 births
Living people
Italian male hurdlers
Athletics competitors of Fiamme Oro
Athletics competitors of Gruppo Sportivo Esercito